The Table tennis competition in the 2007 Summer Universiade were held in Bangkok, Thailand.

Medal overview

Medal table

References
 Sports123 (archived)
 World University Games Table Tennis on HickokSports.com (archived)

Universiade
2007 Summer Universiade
2007
Table tennis competitions in Thailand